Manmohan Bawa is a writer, painter and a cartographer from Punjab and Himachal Pradesh, India. He has written novels, anthologies of short stories, travelogues, travel guides in addition to publishing trekking maps of some Himalayan regions.

Early life 
Bawa was born in 1932 in Vairowal Bawian, district Tarn-Taran. He spent first five years in Verowal, and the following five years in Dhuri in erstwhile Patiala state, eventually moving to New Delhi in 1942.

Passing grade 10 in 1947, Bawa went on to get a Master of Art degree in history. Bawa expressed interest in art and travelling from a young age. Due to very hard financial family circumstances, he started working as an apprentice artist at the age of 16. He worked as a graphic artist for 25 years in different presses and firms, including  an American firm, beginning in 1948 at a salary of Rs 50 per month. He eventually got tired of working and left the job in 1973.

Business 
Along with his brothers, Bawa purchased a hotel to make living and to live a free and full life, pursuing other interests: painting, traveling, trekking in the Himalayas and writing. Though his first book of short story was published in 1962, Bawa only started writing seriously at the age of 55. His interest in writing being history and mythology, his first book of short story, Ajat Sundari, was published in 1990. Along with history the themes of his writing were adivasis and dalits. He published several travelogues, short story collections, novels in Punjabi and one book on history and Indian mythology.

Bawa is also brother of the painter Manjit Bawa.

Awards 

 Rupinder Mann Memorial Award
 Kusmanjali Award
 Odisha Sahitya Academy Award

Bibliography

Collections of short stories 
 ਚਿੱਟੇ ਘੋੜੇ ਦਾ ਸਵਾਰ
 ਕਾਲਾ ਕਬੂਤਰ
 ਅਜਾਤ ਸੁੰਦਰੀ 
 ਇੱਕ ਰਾਤ
 ਨਰ ਬਲੀ 
 ਬਾਦਬਾਨੀ ਕਿਸ਼ਤੀ

Novels 
 1857 ਦਿੱਲੀ ਦਿੱਲੀ/1857 Delhi Delhi
 ਯੁੱਧ ਨਾਦ/Yudh Naad
 ਯੁਗ ਅੰਤ/Yug Ant
 ਅਫ਼ਗਾਨਿਸਤਾਨ ਦੀ ਉਰਸੁਲਾ / Afghanistan Di Urusula
 ਕਾਲ ਕਥਾ/Kal-Kathaa

Travelogues and Travel Guides 
 Tuseen Vi Chalo Mere Naal  
 ਅਣਡਿੱਠੇ ਰਸਤੇ, ਉੱਚੇ ਪਰਬਤ 
 ਇੱਕ ਪਰਬਤ ਤੇ ਦੋ ਦਰਿਆ 
 ਪਥ ਹੀ ਮੰਜ਼ਿਲ ਹੈ 
 ਜੰਗਲ ਜੰਗਲ ਪਰਬਤ ਪਰਬਤ 
 ਆਓ ਚਲੀਏ ਬਰਫ਼ਾਂ ਦੇ ਪਾਰ 
 20,000 ਮੀਲ ਲੰਬੀ ਦੇਸ਼ ਕਾਲ ਯਾਤਰਾ 
 Adventures in the Snows
 Adventures in the Mountains
 A Touring and Trekking Guide to the Indian Himalayas
 Himachal Pradesh

Other Works 
 ਭਾਰਤੀ ਇਤਿਹਾਸ ਮਿਥਿਹਾਸ

References

External links 
 An Inborn Trekker, Bawa has many books to his credit
 Novelist Manmohan Bawa gets Rupinder Mann Memorial Award
 Article on Manmohan Bawa in Punjabi Alochna
 A list of books by Manmohan Bawa
 Documentary on Manmohan Bawa
  Kala Kabootar Audio Book https://www.youtube.com/watch?v=OOH6NOES7kA

Punjabi people
Writers from Amritsar
Sikh writers
Living people
1932 births